is a chain of eikaiwa English conversation schools in Japan. It is a branch of Berlitz Corporation, a subsidiary of ILSC Holdings LP.

As of 2014, it had 1,800 employees and in 2020 it has 60 branches located all around Japan.

History

Berlitz's first branch in Japan was established in Akasaka in 1966, in the midst of Japan's postwar economic boom. The Berlitz School of Languages, Inc's Japanese branch was established as an organization on December 18, 1980.

In 1990 Benesse Corporation acquired a stake in Berlitz International, and in 2001 Benesse completed their acquisition, owning 100% of Berlitz's stock.

In 2009 Berlitz Corporation acquired Phoenix Associates, which specialized in providing business and language training. Effective January 1, 2013 the company, which had 228 staff as of October 31, 2012, was fully merged into Berlitz Corporation.

In February 2022, as part of the sale of Berlitz Corporation to ILSC Holdings LP, Benesse decided to transfer all shares of Berlitz Japan (15.75% of all shares held by Benesse) to Berlitz Corporation.

Headquarters
Berlitz Japan's headquarters are located on the 7th floor of the Nishi-Shinjuku Showa Building in Shinjuku, Tokyo.

Branches
Berlitz Japan currently (as of 2014) has  learning centers located all across Japan. 28 branches are located in Tokyo, nine in Kanagawa Prefecture, five in Aichi Prefecture and Osaka Prefecture, three each in Chiba Prefecture, and Hyogo Prefecture. Kyoto Prefecture has two learning centers as does Shizuoka Prefecture. There are one each in Saitama Prefecture, Miyagi Prefecture, Okayama Prefecture, and Hiroshima Prefecture.

Languages offered
English, French, German, Spanish, Italian, Portuguese, Russian, Chinese, Korean, Japanese, Arabic, Indonesian, Thai, Vietnamese, Dutch and others.

Changes in conditions
In 1991 Berlitz teachers were required to do 30 lessons a week for a monthly salary of ¥250,000. As of 2013 they were required to do 40 lessons a week for the same salary. Starting from 2018 company started offering FTI (Full-Time Instructor) contracts with 50 lessons per week for ¥275,000 a month.

Unions
In Japan, teachers at Berlitz are represented by several unions. In the Kansai region they are represented by the General Union, and in the Kanto region they are represented by Begunto, the Berlitz Tokyo General Union, part of the National Union of General Workers. Both unions belong to the National Trade Union Council.

General Union branch
The GU branch of Berlitz Japan was founded in 1993, and since that time has won a number of improvements for teachers including: Unemployment Insurance and Workers Accident Compensation Insurance enrollment for MG teachers. Health and Pension Insurance (shakai hoken) enrollment for those who work over 30 hours per week. Paid holidays for MG and per lesson teachers. Premium pay of 25% overtime and 35% for work on a set rest day. The right to refuse work on set rest days or national holidays. A pre-consultation agreement with the union before terminating, transferring or changing the working conditions of any union member. Resolving various grievances dealing with dismissals, health insurance, unfair treatment of teachers.

Industrial action
While the situation at Berlitz is different from country to country, in Japan there has been substantial industrial action, including the Berlitz Japan 2007-2008 Strike organized by Begunto, which grew into the longest and largest sustained strike among language teachers in Japan. Berlitz filed suit against the union for damages it says it suffered during the strike, but the claim was rejected by the Tokyo District Court on 27 February 2012. Within a week Berlitz had appealed the ruling to the high court, with the first court date being on May 28, 2012. The final hearing was held on December 27, 2012, when an agreement was struck between Berlitz and the union. Berlitz withdrew their high court lawsuit and new rules for collective bargaining were also established. They will again be conducted in English, after the language was changed to Japanese previously. Berlitz also promised to disclose more financial information to the union. The company also agreed to pay a base-up raise to current union members plus a lump sum bonus to the union.

See also
 Maximilian Berlitz, the founder of Berlitz Corporation

References

External links
 
 General Union Berlitz branch website
 Berlitz Tokyo Union website

English conversation schools in Japan
Educational institutions established in 1980
Benesse
1980 establishments in Japan